Viktor Mikhailovich Kolotov (3 July 1949 – 3 January 2000) was a Soviet and Ukrainian footballer.

He was born in the settlement of Yudino, Kazan municipality. Today the settlement is included in the Kirov Raion of Kazan city. After becoming a coach he extended his welcomed stay in Kyiv. Together with Dynamo Kyiv he became the four-time champion of the USSR as well as the two-time holder of the USSR Cup. Also in Europe he participated in the memorable 1976–1975 season when Dynamo Kyiv conquered the Cup Winner's Cup and the UEFA Super Cup. Kolotov was also a European vice-champion (1972).

In 1979, Kolotov played couple of games for Ukraine at the Spartakiad of the Peoples of the USSR.

Statistics for Dynamo

The statistics in USSR Cups and Europe is made under the scheme "autumn-spring" and enlisted in a year of start of tournaments

Honours
Dynamo Kyiv
Soviet Top League (6): 1971, 1974, 1975, 1977, 1980, 1981
Soviet Cup (2): 1974, 1978
European Cup Winners' Cup (1): 1974–75
European Super Cup (1): 1975

References

External links
RussiaTeam biography
 

1949 births
2000 deaths
Footballers from Kazan
Soviet footballers
Association football midfielders
Russian emigrants to Ukraine
Ukrainian people of Russian descent
Soviet Union international footballers
UEFA Euro 1972 players
Olympic footballers of the Soviet Union
Footballers at the 1972 Summer Olympics
Footballers at the 1976 Summer Olympics
Olympic bronze medalists for the Soviet Union
FC Rubin Kazan players
FC Dynamo Kyiv players
Soviet Top League players
Soviet First League players
Soviet Second League players
Soviet football managers
Ukrainian football managers
FC Arsenal Kyiv managers
Ukraine national under-21 football team managers
FC Spartak Ivano-Frankivsk managers
Ukrainian Premier League managers
Ukrainian Second League managers
Olympic medalists in football
Honoured Masters of Sport of the USSR
Merited Coaches of Ukraine
Medalists at the 1976 Summer Olympics
Medalists at the 1972 Summer Olympics